Keyworth United Football Club is an English football club based in Keyworth, near Nottingham, Nottinghamshire. The club is a FA Charter Standard Club affiliated to the Nottinghamshire County Football Association.

History

They played in the FA Vase in the 1980s.

References

External links

Football clubs in Nottinghamshire
Football clubs in England
Central Midlands Football League
Nottinghamshire Senior League